Ferndale Athletic Football Club were a Welsh football club from the town of Ferndale in Rhondda Cynon Taf, Wales. They played in the Welsh Football League for 42 seasons.

History
The club joined the Welsh Football League for the 1956–57 season, and immediately saw success, finishing as runners-up in Welsh Football League Division Two East. They remained in the Welsh League until leaving the league after the 1997–98 season. The club folded the following year.

The club's best performance was the 1974–75 when they finished as runners-up by one point to Newport County's reserves side, in Premier Division, which was the top tier of league football in the south of Wales at the time.

Honours
The following information is sourced from the club's entry on Football Club History Database.

Welsh Football League Premier Division (Tier 1)
Runners-up: 1974–75
Welsh Football League Division Two East (Tier 2)
Champions: 1961–62
Runners-up: 1956–57
Welsh Football League Premier Division (Tier 2)
Runners-up: 1989–90
Welsh Football League Division Two (Tier 3)
Champions: 1981–82
South Wales Senior Cup
Runners-up: 1975–76

References

Welsh Football League clubs
Defunct football clubs in Wales
1999 disestablishments in Wales
Association football clubs disestablished in 1999
Sport in Rhondda Cynon Taf